Wembo-Nyama Airport  is an airstrip serving the village of Wembo Nyama in Sankuru Province, Democratic Republic of the Congo.

See also

Transport in the Democratic Republic of the Congo
List of airports in the Democratic Republic of the Congo

References

External links
 OpenStreetMap - Wembo Nyama
 OurAirports - Wembo-Nyama
 FallingRain - Wembo-Nyama

Airports in Sankuru